Depsidones (+ "depside" + "one") are chemical compounds that are sometimes found as secondary metabolites in lichens. They are esters that are both depsides and cyclic ethers. An example is norstictic acid.

References

Biochemistry
Carboxylate esters